This is a list of bridges and tunnels on the National Register of Historic Places in the U.S. state of South Carolina.

References

 
South Carolina
Bridges
Bridges